Tippy is a nickname and given name, the latter for fictional characters. It may refer to:

People
Tippy D'Auria (born 1935), American amateur astronomer
Tippy Barton, a stage name of Josh White (1914–1969), American singer, guitarist, songwriter, actor and civil rights activist
Tom Day (American football) (1935–2000), American Football League player
Tippy Dos Santos (born 1994), Filipino-American singer and actress
Tippy Dye (1915–2012), American college athlete, coach and athletic director
Tippy de Lanoy Meijer (born 1943), Dutch former field hockey player
Tippy Larkin (1917–1992), American boxer born Antonio Pilliteri
Tippy Martinez (born 1950), American retired Major League Baseball pitcher
Tippy Packard (born 1995), Hong Kong-American figure skater
Tippy Walker (born 1947), American child actress

Fictional characters
Tippy (Is the Order a Rabbit?), in the manga series Is the Order a Rabbit?
Tippy Dink, in the American animated TV series Doug
The title character of the 2003 American children's book Tippy Lemmey
Tippy Tinkletrousers, a villain in the Captain Underpants children's novel series

See also
Tippi (disambiguation)

Lists of people by nickname